Eric Gustavsson (born 29 January 1982) is a retired Swedish football midfielder.

References

1982 births
Living people
Swedish footballers
Örgryte IS players
Eric Gustavsson
FC Trollhättan players
Association football midfielders
Swedish expatriate footballers
Expatriate footballers in Iceland
Swedish expatriate sportspeople in Iceland
Allsvenskan players
Superettan players